Pierre Edwards (born May 7, 1967) known as Pierre, is an American actor, director, writer, and stand-up comedian. Pierre is best known for producing, writing, directing, and starring as Dre Mitchell in For Da Love of Money (2002), and starring in such films as 2001: A Space Travesty (2000), Def Jam's How to Be a Player (1997), and B*A*P*S (1997).

Early life 

Born to a German mother and American soldier, Pierre was born on May 7, 1967, in Killeen, Texas. He was 3 weeks old when his family moved to Germany. At age eleven he moved back to the United States of America, and resided in Washington DC. His defense against cultural change and bullying was comedy. In the 6th grade he was selected to be on Good Morning America for his humor.

Pierre in high school began performing at comedy clubs in the DC area, with comedians such as: Martin Lawrence, Dave Chappelle, Wanda Sykes and Tommy Davidson. In 1987, after being shot multiple times Pierre decided to pursue comedy seriously. Seeing the success of his peers in Hollywood, he ventured West in 1991.

Career 
Pierre appeared on the first year of HBO's Def Comedy Jam, than starred on BET Comicview. Pierre was also featured on comedy shows: Showtime at the Apollo, Martin Lawrence Presents First Amendment and other late nite TV shows.
 
He worked alongside Oscar winner Halle Berry and Natalie Desselle when he played Nisi's boyfriend in the 1997 movie B*A*P*S, starred opposite  Bill Bellamy in Def Jam's How to Be a Player, and played partner (detective) to actor Leslie Nielsen in the movie 2001: A Space Travesty. After a few small roles in The Wash and The Breaks he wrote, produced, directed and starred in the theatrical urban classic For Da Love of Money.

Pierre has also toured with R&B acts Mary J Blige, Dru Hill, New Edition, Patti LaBelle, Frankie Beverly, etc.

The radio world got a chance to experience Pierre with his numerous guest hosting appearances on the Steve Harvey Morning show. His first love is the comedy club stage, where he has headlined: Improv's  (Dallas, Houston), Carolines (NYC), the FunnyBone (Shreveport La, Boise Id, Vicksburg, Ms),  Uptown Comedy Corner (Atlanta) and many more. He has also performed at events such as, 'Damon Williams' annual 'New Year's Eve Comedy Bash' at Star Plaza'.

Pierre has performed for the troops home and abroad. He has also performed in comedy festivals overseas: Japan, South Africa, Germany, Amsterdam, England, etc.

Currently Pierre is working on a web series Dating Pierre, Slice Trilogy, and a self-published book "100 Homies and Phonies of Hollywood".

In mid-2020 Pierre became one of the lead Analyst of ComedyHype News. He's also the host of his own wildly star studded popular podcast 'Pierre's Panic Room'.

Filmography

Film

Television

Music video

Literature

References

External links 
 TV Guide Page
 Funny Bone Page
 Comedy House Page
 
 Dating Pierre Official Facebook Page

Living people
Date of birth missing (living people)
American male actors
African-American stand-up comedians
African-American male comedians
American male comedians
American stand-up comedians
African-American screenwriters
African-American film directors
American film directors
21st-century American comedians
American people of German descent
21st-century American screenwriters
1967 births
21st-century African-American writers
20th-century African-American people